Spectrum mall may refer to:

 Spectrum Mall (Chennai), a shopping mall in Chennai, India
 Christown Spectrum Mall, a shopping mall in Phoenix, Arizona, United States